The 2000 Metro Atlantic Athletic Conference men's basketball tournament took place March 3–6, 2000, at the Times Union Center in Albany, New York.  The winner, Iona, was crowned with the Metro Atlantic Athletic Conference championship and received an automatic bid into the 2000 NCAA tournament.

Bracket

* denotes overtime game

References

1999–2000 Metro Atlantic Athletic Conference men's basketball season
MAAC men's basketball tournament
Sports competitions in Albany, New York
MAAC men's basketball tournament
MAAC men's basketball tournament